Angela Barnwell (11 January 1936 – 29 June 1965) was a British swimmer. She competed in two events at the 1952 Summer Olympics. She won the 1952 ASA National Championship 100 metres freestyle title.

She died from cancer, aged 29.

References

1936 births
1965 deaths
British female swimmers
Olympic swimmers of Great Britain
Swimmers at the 1952 Summer Olympics
Sportspeople from Worthing
20th-century British women